The Bishoprics of Chester and Man Act 1541 was an Act of the Parliament of England that transferred the jurisdiction over the Dioceses of Chester and Sodor and Man from the Archdiocese of Canterbury to the Archdiocese of York.

It was a rare pre-revestment example the English Parliament exercising its rights to pass legislation for the Isle of Man, notwithstanding the Island's own insular parliament, Tynwald.

The long title of the Act was An Act for dissevering the Bishoprick of Chester and of the Isle of Man from the jurisdiction of Canterbury to the jurisdiction of York. The Act, its action having been spent, has since been repealed.

Government of the Isle of Man
Manx law
Acts of the Parliament of England concerning religion
Diocese of Sodor and Man
16th century in Europe
1541 in law
1541 in England
Christianity and law in the 16th century
Diocese of Chester
1541 in religion